Dainava may refer to:

 Dainava, an alternative name for Dzūkija, a region of Lithuania
 Dainava (Kaunas), a neighbourhood in Kaunas city, Lithuania
 Dainava (Varėna), a village in Varėna district municipality, Alytus County, Lithuania
 FK Dainava Alytus, Lithuanian football club